Dovenby Hall is a country house in  of land at Dovenby, about  north-west of Cockermouth, Cumbria, England. It is a Grade II listed building.

History 
The oldest part of the estate is a 13th-century peel tower. The main house was built for Sir Thomas Lamplugh in the 16th century and, after the house came into the ownership of the Dykes family in about 1800, it was remodelled for the Ballentine-Dykes family in the early 19th century.

Joseph Dykes Ballantine Dykes was High Sheriff of Cumberland for 1807-08 and resided in the house. His eldest son Fretcheville Lawson Ballantine-Dykes served as Member of Parliament for Cockermouth from 1832 to 1836. The property passed down to Frecheville Hubert Ballantine-Dykes, an Army officer and High Sheriff for 1923–24.

A family member was Chairman of the Maryport and Carlisle Railway in the 1840s. A private station named  was provided for the family's use. It closed and the line was lifted in 1935.

The house was acquired by the local authorities from Colonel Ballantine-Dykes for use as a mental hospital in 1930. Following the closure of the hospital, it was bought by Malcolm Wilson, a former rally driver, in January 1998 and, after a major refurbishment, then became home to his M-Sport's World Rally Championship team, which was in partnership with Ford's official team for many years.

See also
The Dykes family

References

Sources
 

Country houses in Cumbria
Peel towers in Cumbria
Grade II listed buildings in Cumbria
Bridekirk